Nicolaus Dinaricio (born in 1700 in Hvar) was a Croatian clergyman and bishop for the Roman Catholic Archdiocese of Split-Makarska. He was appointed bishop in 1757. He died in 1764.

References 

1700 births
1764 deaths
Croatian Roman Catholic bishops
Bishops of Split